A Son of Sam law (also known as a notoriety-for-profit law) is an American English term for any law designed to keep criminals from profiting from the publicity of their crimes, for instance by selling their stories to publishers. Such laws often authorize the state to seize money earned from deals such as book/movie biographies and paid interviews and use it to compensate the criminal's victims. 

These laws have been criticized as violating the free-speech guarantee of the First Amendment to the United States Constitution. The original and namesake law, from New York State, was itself ruled unconstitutional by the Supreme Court of the United States, but New York and other states have since passed laws with similar goals that attempt to comply with the Court's decision.

In certain cases, a Son of Sam law can be extended beyond the criminals themselves to include friends, neighbors, and family members of the lawbreaker who seek to profit by telling publishers and filmmakers of their relation to the criminal. In other cases, a person may not financially benefit from the sale of a story or any other mementos pertaining to the crime.

History
The term "Son of Sam" is derived from the first law of this type, targeted at serial killer David Berkowitz, who used the name "Son of Sam" during his notorious murder spree in mid-1970s New York. After his arrest in August 1977, Berkowitz's intense presence in the media led to widespread speculation that he might sell his story to a writer or filmmaker. Although Berkowitz denied wanting any kind of deal, the New York State Legislature swiftly passed preemptive legal statutes anyway, the first legal restriction of its kind in the U.S. The original New York law was invoked in New York eleven times between 1977 and 1990, including once against Mark David Chapman, the murderer of musician John Lennon.

Critics argued that the law infringed on freedom of speech and therefore violated the First Amendment, and that "Son of Sam" laws take away the financial incentive for many criminals to tell their stories, some of which (such as the Watergate scandal) were of vital interest to the general public.

In 1987, lawyers for publishing company Simon & Schuster sued the New York authorities to prevent enforcement of the Son of Sam law with respect to a book they were about to publish called Wiseguy, written by Nicholas Pileggi. The book was about ex-mobster Henry Hill and was used as the basis for the film Goodfellas. The case reached the U.S. Supreme Court in 1991. In an 8–0 ruling on Simon & Schuster v. Crime Victims Board, the court ruled the law unconstitutional. The majority opinion was that the law was overinclusive, and would have prevented the publication of such works as The Autobiography of Malcolm X, Thoreau's Civil Disobedience, and even The Confessions of Saint Augustine.

Similarly, the state of California's Son of Sam law was struck down in 2002 after being used against Barry Keenan, one of the men who kidnapped Frank Sinatra, Jr. in 1963.

After numerous revisions, New York adopted a new "Son of Sam" law in 2001. This law requires that victims of crimes be notified whenever a person convicted of a crime receives $10,000 (US) or more—from virtually any source. The law then attaches a springing statute of limitations, giving victims an extended period of time to sue the perpetrator of the crime in civil court for their crimes. This law also authorizes a state agency, the Crime Victims' Board, to act on the victims' behalf in some limited circumstances. Thus far, the current New York law has survived court scrutiny.

Related concepts
Regardless of whether a state has a formal Son of Sam law, victims and their families may use civil lawsuits for monetary damages that effectively preclude a wrongdoer (or accused wrongdoer) from profiting from their crime. A prominent example is the litigation between the family of Ron Goldman and O. J. Simpson following Simpson's acquittal for Goldman's murder. Goldman's family won a wrongful death claim against Simpson for more than $30 million. When Simpson later published a book about the murder, If I Did It, a court awarded the book's rights to the Goldman family to help satisfy the judgment.

In high-profile criminal cases and cases that are closely tied to national security, such as convictions for terrorism and espionage, a "Son of Sam clause" has been included in plea bargains. Examples include John Walker Lindh (an American who aided the Taliban in Afghanistan) and Harold James Nicholson (a Central Intelligence Agency officer who spied for Russia). As a result of their plea bargains, any and all profits made from book deals or movie rights would be handed over to the U.S. Treasury. Neither the convicts nor their families would be able to profit.

With the advent of the Internet and online sales, many Son of Sam laws are now targeting the sale of so-called "murderabilia".  Few courts have yet issued opinions regarding the constitutionality of many of these new laws.

Son of Sam laws are distinct from asset forfeiture, the seizing of assets acquired directly as a result of criminal activity. Where asset forfeiture looks to remove the profitability of crimes by taking away money and assets gained as proceeds from the crime, Son of Sam laws are designed so that criminals are unable to take advantage of the notoriety of their crimes.

See also
Eighth Amendment to the United States Constitution

References

External links
 Crime Doesn't Pay - or Does It?: Simon & Schuster, Inc. v. Fischetti

Crime in the United States
David Berkowitz
First Amendment to the United States Constitution
Statutory law